The Oakland Athletics' 2009 season was their 41st in Oakland, California. It was also the 109th season in franchise history. The team finished fourth in the American League West with a record of 75-87.

The Athletics entered the season with a measure of hope. During the 2008-09 offseason, the team added numerous hitters through both trades and free agent signings. The most notable addition was that of outfielder Matt Holliday. Holliday was acquired from the Colorado Rockies in exchange for rookie outfielder Carlos González, starting pitcher Greg Smith, and closer Huston Street. Oakland also added a handful of veterans via free agency; these included Orlando Cabrera, Nomar Garciaparra, and former Athletics superstar Jason Giambi. The signings were meant to improve the team's offense, which was the American League's worst (as measured by number of runs scored) in 2008.

While the Athletics' offense improved considerably in 2009, its gains were largely offset by inconsistent pitching. All told, Oakland would finish the season with a third consecutive losing record.

Regular season

Season standings

Record vs. opponents

Roster

Game log  

|- bgcolor="ffbbbb"
|- align="center" bgcolor="ffbbbb"
| 1 || April 6 || @ Angels || 3–0 || Saunders (1–0) || Braden (0–1) || Fuentes (1) || 43,220 || 0–1
|- align="center" bgcolor="bbffbb"
| 2 || April 7 || @ Angels || 6–4 || Wuertz (1–0) || Jepsen (0–1) || Ziegler (1) || 43,396 || 1–1
|- align="center" bgcolor="bbffbb"
| 3 || April 8 || @ Angels || 6–4 || Bailey (1–0) || Fuentes (0–1) || Ziegler (2) || 43,283 || 2–1
|- align="center" bgcolor="bbbbbb"
| || April 9 || @ Angels || colspan=6 |Postponed (death of Angels pitcher Nick Adenhart; rescheduled for August 27)
|- align="center" bgcolor="ffbbbb"
| 4 || April 10 || Mariners || 5–4 || Jakubauskas (1–0) || Anderson (0–1) || Aardsma (1) || 36,067 || 2–2
|- align="center" bgcolor="ffbbbb"
| 5 || April 11 || Mariners || 8–5 || Batista (1–0) || Casilla (0–1) || Morrow (2) || 19,560 || 2–3
|- align="center" bgcolor="ffbbbb"
| 6 || April 12 || Mariners || 1–0 || Bédard (1–0) || Cahill (0–1) || Aardsma (2) || 12,127 || 2–4
|- align="center" bgcolor="bbffbb"
| 7 || April 13 || Red Sox || 8–2 || Braden (1–1) || Lester (0–2) || || 21,331 || 3–4
|- align="center" bgcolor="bbffbb"
| 8 || April 14 || Red Sox || 6 – 5 (12) || Gallagher (1–0) || López (0–1) || || 22,132 || 4–4
|- align="center" bgcolor="ffbbbb"
| 9 || April 15 || Red Sox || 8–2 || Wakefield (1–1) || Anderson (0–2) || || 35,067 || 4–5
|- align="center" bgcolor="bbffbb"
| 10 || April 17 || @ Blue Jays || 8–5 || Bailey (2–0) || League (1–1) || Ziegler (3) || 18,272 || 5–5
|- align="center" bgcolor="ffbbbb"
| 11 || April 18 || @ Blue Jays || 4 – 2 (12) || Frasor (2–0) || Giese (0–1) || || 21,698 || 5–6
|- align="center" bgcolor="ffbbbb"
| 12 || April 19 || @ Blue Jays || 1–0 || Romero (2–0) || Braden (1–2) || Ryan (2) || 22,164 || 5–7
|- align="center" bgcolor="bbbbbb"
| || April 20 || @ Yankees || colspan=6 |Postponed (rain; rescheduled for July 23)
|- align="center" bgcolor="ffbbbb"
| 13 || April 21 || @ Yankees || 5–3 || Pettitte (2–0) || Eveland (0–1) || Rivera (4) || 42,065 || 5–8
|- align="center" bgcolor="ffbbbb"
| 14 || April 22 || @ Yankees || 9 – 7 (14) || Veras (1–1) || Giese (0–2) || || 43,342 || 5–9
|- align="center" bgcolor="ffbbbb"
| 15 || April 24 || Rays || 8–2 || Kazmir (3–1) || Cahill (0–2) || || 20,140 || 5–10
|- align="center" bgcolor="bbffbb"
| 16 || April 25 || Rays || 5–2 || Braden (2–2) || Garza (1–2) || Ziegler (4) || 15,432 || 6–10
|- align="center" bgcolor="bbffbb"
| 17 || April 26 || Rays || 7–1 || Eveland (1–1) || Sonnanstine (0–3) || || 18,689 || 7–10
|- align="center" bgcolor="ffbbbb"
| 18 || April 28 || @ Rangers || 5–4 || Millwood (2–2) || Wuertz (1–1) || Francisco (6) || 12,627 || 7–11
|- align="center" bgcolor="bbbbbb"
| || April 29 || @ Rangers || colspan=6 |Postponed (rain; rescheduled for May 29)
|- align="center" bgcolor="bbffbb"
| 19 || April 30 || @ Rangers || 4–2 || Braden (3–2) || Padilla (1–2) || Wuertz (1) || 13,802 || 8–11
|-

|- bgcolor="ffbbbb"
|- align="center" bgcolor="ffbbbb"
| 20 || May 1 || @ Mariners || 8–7 || Kelley (1–1) || Springer (0–1) || || 25,760 || 8–12
|- align="center" bgcolor="bbffbb"
| 21 || May 2 || @ Mariners || 3–2 || Bailey (3–0) || Aardsma (0–1) || Wuertz (2) || 29,484 || 9–12
|- align="center" bgcolor="ffbbbb"
| 22 || May 3 || @ Mariners || 8 – 7 (15) || Vargas (1–0) || Eveland (1–2) || || 29,963 || 9–13
|- align="center" bgcolor="ffbbbb"
| 23 || May 4 || Angels || 5–2 || Saunders (4–1) || Anderson (0–3) || Fuentes (6) || 10,397 || 9–14
|- align="center" bgcolor="ffbbbb"
| 24 || May 5 || Angels || 5–3 || Loux (2–2) || Braden (3–3) || Fuentes (7) || 13,298 || 9–15
|- align="center" bgcolor="ffbbbb"
| 25 || May 6 || Rangers || 3–2 || Feldman (2–0) || Giese (0–3) || Francisco (9) || 15,342 || 9–16
|- align="center" bgcolor="bbffbb"
| 26 || May 7 || Rangers || 9–4 || Cahill (1–2) || McCarthy (3–1) || || 13,702 || 10–16
|- align="center" bgcolor="bbffbb"
| 27 || May 8 || Blue Jays || 5–3 || Wuertz (2–1) || Richmond (4–1) || Bailey (1) || 14,103 || 11–16
|- align="center" bgcolor="ffbbbb"
| 28 || May 9 || Blue Jays || 6–4 || Tallet (2–1) || Gallagher (1–1) || || 15,817 || 11–17
|- align="center" bgcolor="ffbbbb"
| 29 || May 10 || Blue Jays || 5–0 || Cecil (1–0) || Braden (3–4) || || 15,126 || 11–18
|- align="center" bgcolor="bbffbb"
| 30 || May 12 || Royals || 12–3 || Cahill (2–2) || Hochevar (0–1) || || 10,156 || 12–18
|- align="center" bgcolor="bbffbb"
| 31 || May 13 || Royals || 7–2 || Outman (1–0) || Bannister (3–1) || || 16,057 || 13–18
|- align="center" bgcolor="ffbbbb"
| 32 || May 15 || @ Tigers || 14–1 || Jackson (3–2) || Anderson (0–4) || || 26,770 || 13–19
|- align="center" bgcolor="ffbbbb"
| 33 || May 16 || @ Tigers || 9–1 || Porcello (4–3) || Braden (3–5) || || 31,554 || 13–20
|- align="center" bgcolor="ffbbbb"
| 34 || May 17 || @ Tigers || 11–7 || Miner (3–1) || Cahill (2–3) || || 27,535 || 13–21
|- align="center" bgcolor="ffbbbb"
| 35 || May 18 || @ Rays || 13–4 || Niemann (4–3) || Gallagher (1–2) || || 11,420 || 13–22
|- align="center" bgcolor="bbffbb"
| 36 || May 19 || @ Rays || 4 – 1 (11) || Casilla (1–1) || Wheeler (1–1) || || 12,842 || 14–22
|- align="center" bgcolor="bbffbb"
| 37 || May 20 || @ Rays || 7–6 || Anderson (1–4) || Kazmir (4–4) || Ziegler (5) || 13,721 || 15–22
|- align="center" bgcolor="ffbbbb"
| 38 || May 21 || @ Rays || 6–5 || Nelson (1–0) || Ziegler (0–1) || || 14,374 || 15–23
|- align="center" bgcolor="ffbbbb"
| 39 || May 22 || Diamondbacks || 2–1 || Buckner (1–0) || Cahill (2–4) || Rauch (2) || 13,586 || 15–24
|- align="center" bgcolor="ffbbbb"
| 40 || May 23 || Diamondbacks || 8 – 7 (11) || Peña (4–1) || Breslow (1–3) || Qualls (11) || 21,295 || 15–25
|- align="center" bgcolor="bbffbb"
| 41 || May 24 || Diamondbacks || 6–2 || Outman (2–0) || Garland (4–3) || || 13,792 || 16–25
|- align="center" bgcolor="bbffbb"
| 42 || May 25 || Mariners || 6–1 || Anderson (2–4) || Jakubauskas (3–5) || Cameron (1) || 15,280 || 17–25
|- align="center" bgcolor="bbffbb"
| 43 || May 26 || Mariners || 4–3 || Braden (4–5) || Batista (2–1) || Bailey (2) || 10,371 || 18–25
|- align="center" bgcolor="ffbbbb"
| 44 || May 27 || Mariners || 6–1 || Bédard (3–2) || Cahill (2–5) || || 30,012 || 18–26
|- align="center" bgcolor="ffbbbb"
| 45 || May 29 || @ Rangers || 6–3 || Wilson (3–2) || Casilla (1–2) || Francisco (11) || || 18–27
|- align="center" bgcolor="ffbbbb"
| 46 || May 29 || @ Rangers || 5–2 || Feldman (4–0) || É. González (0–1) || Wilson (4) || 30,496 || 18–28
|- align="center" bgcolor="ffbbbb"
| 47 || May 30 || @ Rangers || 14–1 || McCarthy (5–2) || Anderson (2–5) || || 45,325 || 18–29
|- align="center" bgcolor="bbffbb"
| 48 || May 31 || @ Rangers || 5–4 || Bailey (4–0) || Francisco (1–1) || || 22,952 || 19–29
|-

|- bgcolor="ffbbbb"
|- align="center" bgcolor="ffbbbb"
| 49 || June 1 || @ White Sox || 6–2 || Thornton (3–1) || Breslow (1–4) || || 26,038 || 19–30
|- align="center" bgcolor="bbffbb"
| 50 || June 2 || @ White Sox || 5–0 || Mazzaro (1–0) || Colón (3–5) || || 20,519 || 20–30
|- align="center" bgcolor="bbffbb"
| 51 || June 3 || @ White Sox || 5–3 || Outman (3–0) || Richard (2–1) || Bailey (3) || 23,207 || 21–30
|- align="center" bgcolor="bbffbb"
| 52 || June 4 || @ White Sox || 7–0 || Anderson (3–5) || Buehrle (6–2) || || 18,219 || 22–30
|- align="center" bgcolor="bbffbb"
| 53 || June 5 || Orioles || 9–1 || Braden (5–5) || Guthrie (4–5) || || 12,608 || 23–30
|- align="center" bgcolor="bbffbb"
| 54 || June 6 || Orioles || 9–4 || Cahill (3–5) || Berken (1–2) || || 20,267 || 24–30
|- align="center" bgcolor="bbffbb"
| 55 || June 7 || Orioles || 3–0 || Mazzaro (2–0) || Hill (2–1) || Bailey (4) || 17,208 || 25–30
|- align="center" bgcolor="bbffbb"
| 56 || June 8 || Twins || 4–3 || Outman (4–0) || Ayala (1–2) || Bailey (5) || 10,181 || 26–30
|- align="center" bgcolor="ffbbbb"
| 57 || June 9 || Twins || 10–5 || Baker (4–6) || Anderson (3–6) || Nathan (12) || 10,127 || 26–31
|- align="center" bgcolor="ffbbbb"
| 58 || June 10 || Twins || 6–3 || Guerrier (3–0) || Bailey (4–1) || Nathan (13) || 18,074 || 26–32
|- align="center" bgcolor="bbffbb"
| 59 || June 11 || Twins || 4–3 || Ziegler (1–1) || Henn (0–2) || || 13,383 || 27–32
|- align="center" bgcolor="ffbbbb"
| 60 || June 12 || @ Giants || 3–0 || Lincecum (6–1) || Mazzaro (2–1) || || 36,035 || 27–33
|- align="center" bgcolor="ffbbbb"
| 61 || June 13 || @ Giants || 5–2 || Johnson (6–5) || Outman (4–1) || Wilson (17) || 37,874 || 27–34
|- align="center" bgcolor="ffbbbb"
| 62 || June 14 || @ Giants || 7–1 || Cain (9–1) || Anderson (3–7) || || 37,728 || 27–35
|- align="center" bgcolor="ffbbbb"
| 63 || June 16 || @ Dodgers || 5 – 4 (10) || Mota (3–1) || Ziegler (1–2) || || 41,169 || 27–36
|- align="center" bgcolor="bbffbb"
| 64 || June 17 || @ Dodgers || 5–4 || Cahill (4–5) || Kuroda (1–3) || Bailey (6) || 46,274 || 28–36
|- align="center" bgcolor="ffbbbb"
| 65 || June 18 || @ Dodgers || 3–2 || Leach (2–0) || Ziegler (1–3) || Troncoso (4) || 50,492 || 28–37
|- align="center" bgcolor="bbffbb"
| 66 || June 19 || @ Padres || 7–5 || Wuertz (3–1) || Mujica (2–2) || Bailey (7) || 20,019 || 29–37 
|- align="center" bgcolor="bbffbb"
| 67 || June 20 || @ Padres || 6–3 || Wuertz (4–1) || Meredith (4–1) || Bailey (8) || 28,074 || 30–37 
|- align="center" bgcolor="ffbbbb"
| 68 || June 21 || @ Padres || 4–1 || Correia (4–5) || Braden (5–6) || Bell (19) || 24,249 || 30–38
|- align="center" bgcolor="bbffbb"
| 69 || June 22 || Giants || 5–1 || Cahill (5–5) || Sánchez (2–8) || Ziegler (6) || 27,324 || 31–38 
|- align="center" bgcolor="ffbbbb"
| 70 || June 23 || Giants || 4–1 || Lincecum (7–2) || Mazzaro (2–2) || || 32,854 || 31–39 
|- align="center" bgcolor="ffbbbb"
| 71 || June 24 || Giants || 6–3 || Johnson (7–5) || G. Gonzalez (0–1) || Wilson (20) || 35,067 || 31–40 
|- align="center" bgcolor="ffbbbb"
| 72 || June 26 || Rockies || 4–2 || Hammel (5–3) || Braden (5–7) || Street (17) || 20,872 || 31–41 
|- align="center" bgcolor="ffbbbb"
| 73 || June 27 || Rockies || 11–9 || de la Rosa (4–7) || Cahill (5–6) || Street (18) || 18,624 || 31–42 
|- align="center" bgcolor="ffbbbb"
| 74 || June 28 || Rockies || 3–1 || Cook (8–3) || Mazzaro (2–3) || Street (19) || 15,701 || 31–43
|- align="center" bgcolor="bbffbb"
| 75 || June 29 || Tigers || 7–1 || Anderson (4–7) || Porcello (8–5) || || 10,563 || 32–43
|- align="center" bgcolor="ffbbbb"
| 76 || June 30 || Tigers || 5–3 || Galarraga (5–7) || G. Gonzalez (0–2) || || 12,126 || 32–44
|-

|- bgcolor="ffbbbb"
|- align="center" bgcolor="bbffbb"
| 77 || July 1 || Tigers || 5–1 || Braden (6–7) || Verlander (8–4) || || 21,238 || 33–44 
|- align="center" bgcolor="ffbbbb"
| 78 || July 3 || @ Indians || 15–3 || Huff (4–3) || Cahill (5–7) || || 26,557 || 33–45
|- align="center" bgcolor="ffbbbb"
| 79 || July 4 || @ Indians || 5–2 || Pavano (7–7) || Mazzaro (2–4) || Wood (10) || 24,501 || 33–46
|- align="center" bgcolor="bbffbb"
| 80 || July 5 || @ Indians || 5–2 || G. Gonzalez (1–2) || Lee (4–7) || Bailey (9) || 19,105 || 34–46
|- align="center" bgcolor="bbffbb"
| 81 || July 6 || @ Red Sox || 6–0 || Anderson (5–7) || Smoltz (0–2) || || 38,294 || 35–46
|- align="center" bgcolor="ffbbbb" 
| 82 || July 7 || @ Red Sox || 5–2 || Beckett (10–3) || Eveland (1–3) || Papelbon (21) || 37,676 || 35–47
|- align="center" bgcolor="ffbbbb" 
| 83 || July 8 || @ Red Sox || 5–4 || Wakefield (11–3) || Cahill (5–8) || Papelbon (22) || 37,981 || 35–48
|- align="center" bgcolor="ffbbbb"
| 84 || July 10 || @ Rays || 6–0 || Niemann (8–4) || Mazzaro (2–5) || || 20,358 || 35–49
|- align="center" bgcolor="bbffbb"
| 85 || July 11 || @ Rays || 7–2 || Braden (7–7) || Garza (6–7) || || 33,273 || 36–49
|- align="center" bgcolor="bbffbb"
| 86 || July 12 || @ Rays || 7–3 || Wuertz (5–1) || Wheeler (3–2) || Bailey (10) || 29,727 || 37–49
|- align="center" bgcolor="ffbbbb"
| 87 || July 16 || Angels || 6–2 || Santana (2–3) || Braden (7–8) || Fuentes (27)|| 11,113 || 37–50
|- align="center" bgcolor="bbffbb"
| 88 || July 17 || Angels || 7–3 || Breslow (2–4)|| Saunders (8–6) || || 17,147 || 38–50
|- align="center" bgcolor="ffbbbb"
| 89 || July 18 || Angels || 11–6 || Oliver (4–0) || Mazzaro (2–6) || || 16,475 || 38–51
|- align="center" bgcolor="ffbbbb"
| 90 || July 19 || Angels || 1 – 0 (10) || Lackey (5–4) || Bailey (4–2) || Fuentes (28) || 18,539 || 38–52
|- align="center" bgcolor="bbffbb"
| 91 || July 20 || Twins || 14–13 || Breslow (3–4) || Mijares (0–2) || Wuertz (3) || 10,283 || 39–52
|- align="center" bgcolor="ffbbbb"
| 92 || July 21 || Twins || 3 – 2 (10) || Guerrier (5–0) || Bailey (4–3) || Nathan (26) || 12,027 || 39–53 
|- align="center" bgcolor="bbffbb"
| 93 || July 22 || Twins || 16–1 || Cahill (6–8) || Perkins (5–6) || || 22,031 || 40–53
|- align="center" bgcolor="ffbbbb"
| 94 || July 23 || @ Yankees || 6–3 || Sabathia (10–6) || Mazzaro (2–7) || Hughes (1) || 44,206 || 40–54
|- align="center" bgcolor="ffbbbb"
| 95 || July 24 || @ Yankees || 8–3 || Chamberlain (6–2) || Anderson (5–8) || || 46,086 || 40–55
|- align="center" bgcolor="bbffbb"
| 96 || July 25 || @ Yankees || 6–4 || G. Gonzalez (2–2) || Pettitte (8–6) || Bailey (11) || 46,412 || 41–55
|- align="center" bgcolor="ffbbbb"
| 97 || July 26 || @ Yankees || 7–5 || Coke (2–3) || Braden (7–9) || Rivera (29) || 46,163 || 41–56
|- align="center" bgcolor="ffbbbb"
| 98 || July 27 || @ Red Sox || 8–2 || Beckett (12–4) || Cahill (6–9) || || 37,955 || 41–57 
|- align="center" bgcolor="bbffbb"
| 99 || July 28 || @ Red Sox || 9 – 8 (11) || Berslow (4–4) || Delcarmen (2–2) || Bailey (12) || 38,084 || 42–57
|- align="center" bgcolor="bbffbb"
| 100 || July 29 || @ Red Sox || 8–6 || Anderson (6–8) || Penny (7–5) || Bailey (13) || 38,193 || 43–57
|- align="center" bgcolor="ffbbbb" 
| 101 || July 30 || @ Red Sox || 8–5 || Delcarmen (3–2) || Breslow (4–5) || Papelbon (26) || 37,919 || 43–58
|- align="center" bgcolor="bbffbb"
| 102 || July 31 || Blue Jays || 8–5 || Braden (8–9) || Richmond (6–6)|| Bailey (14) || 12,151 || 44–58 
|-

|- bgcolor="ffbbbb"
|- align="center" bgcolor="ffbbbb"
| 103 || August 1 || Blue Jays || 6–5 || Cecil (5–1) || Cahill (6–10) || Frasor (4) || 35,067 || 44–59 
|- align="center" bgcolor="ffbbbb"
| 104 || August 2 || Blue Jays || 7–2 || Romero (10–4) || Mazzaro (2–8) || || 13,070 || 44–60 
|- align="center" bgcolor="bbffbb"
| 105 || August 3 || Rangers || 3–2 || Wuertz (6–1) || Wilson (4–5) || || 10,523 || 45–60 
|- align="center" bgcolor="bbffbb"
| 106 || August 4 || Rangers || 6–0 || G. Gonzalez (3–2) || Holland (4–7) || || 10,781 || 46–60
|- align="center" bgcolor="bbffbb"
| 107 || August 5 || Rangers || 7–5 || Breslow (5–5) || Padilla (8–5) || Bailey (15) || 20,560 || 47–60
|- align="center" bgcolor="ffbbbb"
| 108 || August 6 || Rangers || 6–4 || Hunter (4–2) || Cahill (6–11) || Wilson (13) || 17,214 || 47–61
|- align="center" bgcolor="bbffbb"
| 109 || August 7 || @ Royals || 9–4 || Mazzaro (3–8) || Bannister (7–8) || || 21,918 || 48–61
|- align="center" bgcolor="ffbbbb"
| 110 || August 8 || @ Royals || 12–6 || Greinke (11–7) || Mortensen (0–1) || || 29,818 || 48–62
|- align="center" bgcolor="bbffbb"
| 111 || August 9 || @ Royals || 6–3 || Anderson (7–8) || Hochevar (6–5) || Bailey (16) || 19,439 || 49–62
|- align="center" bgcolor="bbffbb"
| 112 || August 10 || @ Orioles || 9–1 || G. Gonzalez (4–2) || Guthrie (7–12) || || 14,688 || 50–62
|- align="center" bgcolor="ffbbbb"
| 113 || August 11 || @ Orioles || 3–2 || Hernandez (4–4) || Cahill (6–12) || Johnson (4) || 23,006 || 50–63
|- align="center" bgcolor="bbffbb"
| 114 || August 12 || @ Orioles || 6–3 || Mazzaro (4–8) || Berken (2–10) || Bailey (17) || 19,128 || 51–63
|- align="center" bgcolor="ffbbbb"
| 115 || August 14 || White Sox || 8 – 7 (10) || Dotel (2–3) || Breslow (5–6) || Jenks (24) || 20,348 || 51–64 
|- align="center" bgcolor="ffbbbb"
| 116 || August 15 || White Sox || 8–1 || Floyd (10–7) || G. Gonzalez (4–3) || || 17,742 || 51–65
|- align="center" bgcolor="bbffbb"
| 117 || August 16 || White Sox || 2–3 || Bailey (5–3) || Jenks (2–4) || || 20,241 || 52–65
|- align="center" bgcolor="bbffbb"
| 118 || August 17 || Yankees || 3–0 || Tomko (2–2) || Burnett (10–6) || Bailey (18) || 24,409 || 53–65
|- align="center" bgcolor="ffbbbb"
| 119 || August 18 || Yankees || 7–2 || Sabathia (14–7) || Marshall (0–1) || || 25,383 || 53–66
|- align="center" bgcolor="ffbbbb"
| 120 || August 19 || Yankees || 3–2 || Aceves (8–1) || Anderson (7–9) || Rivera (36) || 35,067 || 53–67
|- bgcolor="ffbbbb"
| 121 || August 21 || Tigers || 3–2 || Jackson (10–5) || G. Gonzalez (4–4)|| Rodney (26) || 15,927 || 53–68
|- bgcolor="bbffbb"
| 122 || August 22 || Tigers || 3–2 || Bailey (6–3) || Miner (5–4)|| || 26,266 || 54–68
|- bgcolor="bbffbb"
| 123 || August 23 || Tigers || 9–4 || Tomko (3–2) || Porcello (10–8) || || 17,690|| 55–68
|- align="center" bgcolor="ffbbbb" 
| 124 || August 24 || @ Mariners || 3–1 || Snell (4–9) || Mazzaro (4–9) || Aardsma (29) || 21,056 || 55–69
|- align="center" bgcolor="ffbbbb" 
| 125 || August 25 || @ Mariners || 4–2 || Lowe (2–6) || Breslow (5–7) || || 17,661 || 55–70
|- align="center" bgcolor="ffbbbb" 
| 126 || August 26 || @ Mariners || 5–3 || French (4–3) || G. Gonzalez (4–5) || Aardsma (30) || 18,695 || 55–71
|- align="center" bgcolor="bbffbb"
| 127 || August 27 || @ Angels || 2–0 || Cahill (7–12) || Santana (7–7) || Bailey (19) || 43,139 || 56–71
|- align="center" bgcolor="ffbbbb"
| 128 || August 28 || @ Angels || 11–7 || Arredondo (2–3) || Ziegler (1–4) || Fuentes (37) || 41,912 || 56–72
|- align="center" bgcolor="bbffbb"
| 129 || August 29 || @ Angels || 4–3 || Ziegler (2–4) || Rodríguez (0–1) || Bailey (20) || 43,011 || 57–72
|- align="center" bgcolor="ffbbbb"
| 130 || August 30 || @ Angels || 9–1 || Lackey (9–7) || Anderson (7–10) || || 38,018 || 57–73
|- align="center" bgcolor="bbffbb"
| 131 || August 31 || Royals || 8–5 || Breslow (6–7) || Hochevar (6–8) || Bailey (21) || 10,376 || 58–73
|-

|- bgcolor="ffbbbb"
|- align="center" bgcolor="ffbbbb"
| 132 || September 1 || Royals || 4–3 || Davies (6–9) || Marshall (0–2) || Soria (21) || 10,039 || 58–74 
|- align="center" bgcolor="bbffbb"
| 133 || September 2 || Royals || 10–4 || Cahill (8–12) || Bannister (7–12) || || 13,920 || 59–74
|- align="center" bgcolor="ffbbbb"
| 134 || September 3 || Mariners || 7–4 || Snell (6–9) || Tomko (3–3) || Aardsma (34) || 10,297 || 59–75
|- align="center" bgcolor="ffbbbb"
| 135 || September 4 || Mariners || 6–3 || Rowland-Smith (3–2) || Mortensen (0–2) || Lowe (2) || 11,738 || 59–76
|- align="center" bgcolor="bbffbb"
| 136 || September 5 || Mariners || 9–5 || Anderson (8–10) || French (4–5) || Bailey (22) || 16,495 || 60–76
|- align="center" bgcolor="bbffbb"
| 137 || September 6 || Mariners || 5–2 || G. Gonzalez (5–5) || Kelley (4–2) || Bailey (23) || 16,188 || 61–76
|- align="center" bgcolor="bbffbb"
| 138 || September 8 || @ White Sox || 11–3 || Tomko (4–3) || Torres (1–1) || || 24,317 || 62–76
|- align="center" bgcolor="ffbbbb"
| 139 || September 9 || @ White Sox || 4 – 3 (13) || Dotel (3–3) || É. González (0–2) || || 23,703 || 62–77 
|- align="center" bgcolor="bbffbb"
| 140 || September 11 || @ Twins || 12–5 || Mortensen (1–2) || Blackburn (9–11) || || 21,084 || 63–77
|- align="center" bgcolor="bbffbb"
| 141 || September 12 || @ Twins || 4–2 || Anderson (9–10) || Manship (0–1) || Bailey (24) || 24,283 || 64–77
|- align="center" bgcolor="ffbbbb"
| 142 || September 13 || @ Twins || 8–0 || Duensing (3–1) || G. Gonzalez (5–6) || || 21,850 || 64–78
|- align="center" bgcolor="bbffbb"
| 143 || September 14 || @ Rangers || 9–0 || Tomko (5–3) || Feldman (16–5) || || 13,669 || 65–78
|- align="center" bgcolor="bbffbb"
| 144 || September 15 || @ Rangers || 6–1 || Breslow (7–7) || McCarthy (7–3) || || 15,964 || 66–78
|- align="center" bgcolor="bbffbb"
| 145 || September 16 || @ Rangers || 4–0 || Cahill (9–12) || Nippert (5–3) || || 23,372 || 67–78
|- align="center" bgcolor="bbffbb"
| 146 || September 17 || Indians || 5–2 || Mortensen (2–2) || Masterson (4–8) || Bailey (25) || 10,873 || 68–78
|- align="center" bgcolor="bbffbb"
| 147 || September 18 || Indians || 2–1 || Anderson (10–10) || Huff (10–8) || Ziegler (7) || 22,893 || 69–78
|- align="center" bgcolor="bbffbb"
| 148 || September 19 || Indians || 8–4 || Kilby (1–0) || Sowers (6–10) || Wuertz (4) || 17,209 || 70–78
|- align="center" bgcolor="bbffbb"
| 149 || September 20 || Indians || 11–4 || Eveland (2–3) || Carmona (3–12) || || 15,430 || 71–78
|- align="center" bgcolor="ffbbbb"
| 150 || September 21 || Rangers || 10–3 || Millwood (11–10) || É. González (0–3) || || 10,581 || 71–79
|- align="center" bgcolor="bbffbb"
| 151 || September 22 || Rangers || 9–1 || Cahill (10–12) || McCarthy (7–4) || || 10,475 || 72–79
|- align="center" bgcolor="ffbbbb"
| 152 || September 23 || Rangers || 9–8 || Hunter (9–4) || Mortensen (2–3) || Francisco (24) || 18,311 || 72–80
|- align="center" bgcolor="bbffbb"
| 153 || September 24 || Rangers || 12–3 || Anderson (11–10) || Feldman (17–6) || || 11,124 || 73–80
|- align="center" bgcolor="bbffbb"
| 154 || September 25 || @ Angels || 3–0 || G. Gonzalez (6–6) || Weaver (15–8) || Bailey (26) || 43,242 || 74–80
|- align="center" bgcolor="bbffbb"
| 155 || September 26 || @ Angels || 15–10 || Breslow (8–7) || Jepsen (6–4) || || 41,014 || 75–80
|- align="center" bgcolor="ffbbbb"
| 156 || September 27 || @ Angels || 7–4 || Saunders (15–7) || É. González (0–4) || Fuentes (45) || 38,718 || 75–81
|- align="center" bgcolor="ffbbbb"
| 157 || September 29 || @ Mariners || 6–4 || Hernández (18–5) || Cahill (10–13) || || 18,167 || 75–82
|- align="center" bgcolor="ffbbbb"
| 158 || September 30 || @ Mariners || 7–0 || Morrow (2–4) || Mortensen (2–4) || || 16,930 || 75–83
|-

|- bgcolor="ffbbbb"
|- align="center" bgcolor="ffbbbb"
| 159 || October 1 || @ Mariners || 4–2 || Fister (3–4) || Anderson (11–11) || Aardsma (37) || 16,607 || 75–84
|- align="center" bgcolor="ffbbbb"
| 160 || October 2 || Angels || 5–2 || Weaver (16–8) || G. Gonzalez (6–7) || Fuentes (47) || 14,554 || 75–85
|- align="center" bgcolor="ffbbbb"
| 161 || October 3 || Angels || 4–2 || Kazmir (10–9) || Eveland (2–4) || Fuentes (48) || 16,539 || 75–86
|- align="center" bgcolor="ffbbbb"
| 162 || October 4 || Angels || 5–3 || Saunders (16–7) || Gray (0–1) || Jepsen (1) || 16,591 || 75–87
|-

Player stats

Batting
Note: G = Games played; AB = At bats; R = Runs scored; H = Hits; 2B = Doubles; 3B = Triples; HR = Home runs; RBI = Runs batted in; AVG = Batting average; SB = Stolen bases

Pitching
Note: W = Wins; L = Losses; ERA = Earned run average; G = Games pitched; GS = Games started; SV = Saves; IP = Innings pitched; R = Runs allowed; ER = Earned runs allowed; BB = Walks allowed; K = Strikeouts

Awards and honors
On December 22, 2009, Sports Illustrated named general manager Billy Beane as number 10 on its list of the Top 10 GMs/Executives of the Decade (in all sports).

Farm system 

LEAGUE CHAMPIONS: Midland

Notes

References

2009 Oakland Athletics season at Baseball Reference
2009 Oakland Athletics season Official Site (Archived 2009-08-02)

Oakland Athletics seasons
Oakland Athletics
Oakland Athletics Season
Oak